Westward Airways may refer to:

Westward Airways (Nebraska), a defunct airline based in Scottsbluff, Nebraska, that operated 2004–2005
Westward Airways (United Kingdom), an airline based at Land's End Airport, Cornwall, England